The gens Arpineia was an obscure plebeian family at ancient Rome.  It is known chiefly from a single individual, Gaius Arpineius, an eques in the army of Caesar's army during the Gallic Wars.

Origin
The nomen Arpineius belongs to a class of gentilicia formed using the suffix -eius, typically formed from words or names ending in -as.  The root of the nomen is the cognomen Arpinas, a surname indicating a relationship to the city of Arpinum in southern Latium, whence the ancestor of this family probably came.

Members
 Gaius Arpineius, an eques, and a friend of Quintus Titurius Sabinus, who was sent to confer with Ambiorix in 54 BC.

See also
 List of Roman gentes

References

Bibliography
 Gaius Julius Caesar, Commentarii de Bello Gallico (Commentaries on the Gallic War).
 Dictionary of Greek and Roman Biography and Mythology, William Smith, ed., Little, Brown and Company, Boston (1849).
 George Davis Chase, "The Origin of Roman Praenomina", in Harvard Studies in Classical Philology, vol. VIII, pp. 103–184 (1897).

Roman gentes